Souk El-Had is a town and commune in Boumerdès Province, Algeria. According to the 1998 census it has a population of 4,860.

Villages
The villages of the commune of Souk El-Had are:

History

French conquest

 Expedition of the Col des Beni Aïcha (1837)
 First Battle of the Issers (1837)

Algerian Revolution

 Ferme Gauthier

Salafist terrorism

 2007 Souk El Had bombing (11 February 2007)

Rivers

This commune is crossed by several rivers:
 Isser River

Football clubs

Notable people

 Mohamed Deriche, 20th-century leader of the Kabyle political resistance against the French.
 Lyès Deriche, 20th-century leader of the Algerian national political movement against the French.

References

Communes of Boumerdès Province
Cities in Algeria
Algeria